Thüringer Literaturpreis is a literary prize of Germany. It is awarded every two years and is endowed with 12,000 euros. The winners are selected by a three-member independent jury.

Recipients 
 2005 – 
 2007 – Ingo Schulze
 2009 – Reiner Kunze
 2011 – Jürgen Becker
 2013 – Kathrin Schmidt
 2015 – Wulf Kirsten
 2017 – Lutz Seiler
 2019 – Sibylle Berg

References

External links 
 

German literary awards